ElectraNet Pty Ltd, trading as ElectraNet, is an electricity transmission company in South Australia. It operates 5,591 km of high-voltage electricity transmission lines in South Australia.

ElectraNet is owned by Australian Utilities Pty Ltd (53.44%), State Grid Corporation of China (SGCC) (46.56%).

References

External links

 

Companies based in Adelaide
Electric power transmission system operators in Australia